The 2012 NCAA Division III men's basketball tournament was a single-elimination tournament to determine the men's collegiate basketball national champion of National Collegiate Athletic Association (NCAA) Division III. It involved 62 teams, beginning on March 1, 2012 and concluded with the championship game on March 17, 2012, at the Salem Civic Center in Salem, Virginia.

The UW-Whitewater Warhawks won their third Division III title, defeating the Cabrini Cavaliers in the championship game by a score of 63-60.

Tournament schedule and venues

The following are the sites selected to host each round of the 2012 tournament:

First and second rounds
Coles Center, New York, NY (Host: New York University)
O'Brien Center, St. Mary's City, MD (Host: St. Mary's College of Maryland)
Washington University Field House, St. Louis, MO (Host: Washington University in St. Louis)
Beck Center, Lexington, Kentucky (Host: Transylvania University)
DeVos Fieldhouse, Holland, MI (Host: Hope College)
Timken Gymnasium, Wooster, OH (Host: The College of Wooster)
Dixon Center, Radnor, PA (Host: Cabrini College)
Max Ziel Gymnasium, Oswego, NY (Host: State University of New York at Oswego)
Recreation Center, Wayne, NJ (Host: William Paterson University)
Pepin Gymnasium, Middlebury, VT (Host: Middlebury College)
Binder Physical Education Center, Oneonta, NY (Host: Hartwick College)
Sports and Recreation Center, Staten Island, NY (Host: College of Staten Island)
Mayser Center, Lancaster, PA (Host: Franklin & Marshall College)
Karges Center, River Falls, WI (Host: UW-River Falls)
Williams Center, Whitewater, WI (Host: UW-Whitewater)
Mayborn Campus Center, Belton, TX (Host: University of Mary Hardin-Baylor)
LeFrak Gymnasium, Amherst, MA (Host: Amherst College)
Batten Student Center, Virginia Beach, VA (Host: Virginia Wesleyan College)

Sectional sites
Pepin Gymnasium, Middlebury, VT (Host: Middlebury College)
Timken Gymnasium, Wooster, OH (Host: The College of Wooster)
Mayser Center, Lancaster, PA (Host: Franklin & Marshall College)
LeFrak Gymnasium, Amherst, MA (Host: Amherst College)

Final Four - Salem
Salem Civic Center (Host: Old Dominion Athletic Conference)

Qualified teams

Automatic qualifiers
The following teams were automatic qualifiers for the 2013 NCAA field by virtue of winning their conference's tournament (except for the UAA, whose regular-season champion received the automatic bid).

At-large qualifiers
The NCAA Selection Committee, by rule, must select one team from the conferences without automatic berths and non-affiliated schools (Pool B). The Selection Committee makes the remaining 19 selections at-large from all conferences (Pool C).

Bracket
* – Denotes overtime period

Unless otherwise noted, all times listed are Eastern Daylight Time (UTC-04)

Middlebury, VT Sectional

Wooster, OH Sectional

Lancaster, PA Sectional

Whitewater, WI Sectional

Final Four - Salem, Virginia

Record by conference

The R62, R32, S16, E8, F4, CG, NC columns indicate how many teams from each conference were in the round of 62 (first round), round of 32 (second round), Sweet 16, Elite Eight, Final Four, championship game, and national champion, respectively.
The NESCAC and ODAC each had one representative which earned a bye to the second round.
The AMCC, CCC, IIAC, MASCAC, MAC Commonwealth, MAC Freedom, NJAC, North Atlantic, NEAC, Presidents' Athletic Conference, SCIAC, SLIAC, UMAC, and USA South each had one representative, eliminated in the second round with a record of 0–1.
The American Southwest, Empire 8, Heartland had two representatives, eliminated in the first round, with a record of 0–2.

See also
2012 NCAA Division I men's basketball tournament
2012 NCAA Division II men's basketball tournament

References

NCAA Division III men's basketball tournament
Ncaa Tournament